The 1933 Edmonton municipal election was held November 8, 1933 to elect a mayor and five aldermen to sit on City Council and four trustees each to sit on the public and separate school boards.

There were ten aldermen on city council, but five of the positions were already filled: Charles Gibbs, John Wesley Fry, James Ogilvie, James East, and John McCreath were all elected to two-year terms in 1932 and were still in office.

There were seven trustees on the public school board, but three of the positions were already filled:   Mrs. E G Ferris, Frederick Casselman, and Samuel Barnes had all been elected to two-year terms in 1932 and were still in office.  The same was true of the separate school board, where Adrien Crowe (SS), J O Pilon, and W D Trainor were continuing.

Voter turnout

There were 21,730 ballots cast out of 44,603 eligible voters, for a voter turnout of 48.7%.

Results

 bold or  indicates elected
 italics indicate incumbent
 South Side, where data is available, indicates representative for Edmonton's South Side, with a minimum South Side representation instituted after the city of Strathcona, south of the North Saskatchewan River, amalgamated into Edmonton on February 1, 1912.

Mayor

Aldermen
Councillors were elected through Plurality block voting.

The Labour Party took four of the five seats up for election.

Margaret Crang was among them. She was the second woman elected to the Edmonton city council.

Public school trustees

Separate (Catholic) school trustees

Under the minimum South Side representation rule, Tansey was elected over Conroy.

Board of Health Plebiscite

Are you in favor of the health services at present administered by the local Board of Health of the City of Edmonton and the Public and Separate School Boards being amalgamated and placed under the control of the local Board of Health?

Yes - 11,660
No - 7,971

References

Election History, City of Edmonton: Elections and Census Office

1933
1933 elections in Canada
1933 in Alberta